Music for December (translit. Muzyka dlya dekabrya) is a 1995 Russian drama film directed by Ivan Dykhovichny. The film was screened in the Un Certain Regard section at the 1995 Cannes Film Festival.

Plot 
Alexander Larin, a successful Leningrad artist, an emigrant of the last wave, returns to his homeland and meets his former lover Anna and her daughter Masha. What will end the journey to a country that no longer exists? And love, and the former itself, too. The past overtakes the hero as retribution.

Cast
 Gregory Hlady as Larin
 Viktor Bychkov as cyclist
 Nikolai Chindyajkin as Samoilov
 Dmitry Dykhovichny as Dima
 Sergei Kalvarsky as advertising director
 Andrei Kostyukevich as Rastorguev
 Irina Osnovina as pedicurist
 Irina Piganova as Lera
 Margarita Romanova as Secretary
 Yelena Safonova as  Anna Bersenyova
 Vadim Stepantsov as Plotnikov
 Natalya Zhukova as Masha

Awards
 Nika Award for the best sound engineer's work (Ekaterina Popova)

References

External links

1995 films
Russian drama films
1990s Russian-language films
1995 drama films
Films directed by Ivan Dykhovichny

Films set in Saint Petersburg